KSBO-CD, virtual channel 42 (UHF digital channel 36), is a low-powered, Class A Estrella TV affiliate television station licensed to San Luis Obispo, California, United States. Founded on December 29, 1994, the station is owned by HC2 Holdings. The station's main subchannel is rebroadcast on Santa Barbara-licensed KVMM-CD (channel 28), which was acquired from Viacom in the fall of 2019 and formerly carried MTV Tres programming.

Previously, the station was KPXA-LP, running programs from the Pax TV network.

Digital channels
The station's digital signal is multiplexed:

Translators

References

External links
Una Vez Mas official site
Azteca America official site

Innovate Corp.
SBO-CD
SBO-CD
Television channels and stations established in 1998
Low-power television stations in the United States
1998 establishments in California